Aint–Bad, founded in Savannah, Georgia in 2011, is a contemporary photography publisher that produces a quarterly periodical, among other print media and online content.

References

Photography magazines
Photography in the United States